George Evans Goodwin (June 20, 1917 – January 21, 2015) was an American journalist who won a Pulitzer Prize in 1948 for his work at The Atlanta Journal.

Life, education, and career
Goodwin was born in Atlanta, Georgia.  He graduated in 1939 with an A.B. degree and a certificate in journalism from Washington and Lee University in Lexington, Virginia. During World War II he served for three years in the United States Navy, including twenty months on operations as an intelligence officer. During his long career in journalism he reported for The Atlanta Journal and Atlanta Georgian (both of which James M. Cox had acquired in December 1939), the Washington Times-Herald and The Miami Daily News (another Cox property). The Georgia chapter of the Public Relations Society of America's annual award for volunteer service in named in his honor. An authority on public relations, Goodwin advised civic leaders including former Atlanta mayors Maynard Jackson and Shirley Franklin, as well as Ambassador Andrew Young. He had also been a Rotarian Senior Counselor. He died at the age of 97 on January 21, 2015.

Pulitzer Prize
In 1947 Goodwin covered a fraudulent election in Telfair County, Georgia, for The Atlanta Journal. He won the next annual Pulitzer Prize for Local Reporting citing that work.

References

1917 births
2015 deaths
The Atlanta Journal-Constitution people
Pulitzer Prize for Local Reporting winners
Writers from Atlanta
United States Navy officers
United States Navy personnel of World War II
Washington and Lee University alumni